Horb am Neckar is a town in the southwest of the German state of Baden-Württemberg. It has around 25,000 inhabitants, of whom about 6,000 live in the main town of Horb, and the remainder in 18 associated villages and districts which form part of the same municipality. If the entire municipality is counted, it is the largest town in the District of Freudenstadt.

Since 1 January 1981 Horb am Neckar has had the status of a Große Kreisstadt, serving as a mid-sized center within the Northern Black Forest Region of the Karlsruhe Administrative Region. It also belongs to the "Cooperative Zone" of the Stuttgart Metropolitan Region. Horb am Neckar operates a combined administration with the neighbouring communities of Empfingen and Eutingen im Gäu.

Geography
Horb lies on the eastern margin of the northern part of the Black Forest at the Neckar. The well-preserved old town, with an ancient castle and castle gardens and a typical market place where the town hall is still located, lies on a ridge overlooking the Neckar. The modern town and its outskirts stretch up the valleys of both rivers.

Constituent communities
In addition to the main town of Horb, the municipality includes a number of communities which are recognised within the terms of the 1970s Baden-Württemberg local government reform, that is they have an elected council and council chairman. These are Ahldorf, Altheim, Betra, Bildechingen, Bittelbronn, Dettensee, Dettingen, Dettlingen, Dießen, Grünmettstetten, Ihlingen, Isenburg, Mühlen, Mühringen, Nordstetten, Rexingen and Talheim, the last of which is made up of the formerly independent communities of Obertalheim and Untertalheim. These are referred to formally (for example, in postal purposes) as Horb-Ahldorf, Horb-Altheim, etc. There are also other districts with distinct names, such as Hohenberg and Haugenstein, but no formally recognised boundaries, and numerous isolated hamlets with handfuls of inhabitants, such as Fronholzhof, Frundeckhof, Heidgrundhof, Hohenfichtehof, Markstallhof, Auchtert-Höfe, Breitenbaum-Höfe, Josefshof, Käppleshof, Kegelhof, Isenburger Höfe, Buchhöfe, Kreuzhöfe, Plattenhöfe, Ziegelhof, Heidehöfe, Kapellenhöfe, and Röteberg, not to mention even smaller settlements such as Neckarhausen or Priorberg.

Neighbouring municipalities
The following towns and communities border on Horb am Neckar, listing them in clockwise order starting in the east: Eutingen im Gäu (Landkreis Freudenstadt), Starzach (in Landkreis Tübingen), Haigerloch (Zollernalbkreis), Empfingen (Landkreis Freudenstadt), Sulz am Neckar (Landkreis Rottweil), Glatten, Schopfloch and Waldachtal (all in Landkreis Freudenstadt), and finally Haiterbach and Nagold, both in Landkreis Calw).

History
But since Old High German was nearly extinct at that time, it is assumed that Horb is even older than that.

The swampy land along the Neckar forced the builders of the town to lay it out among the foothills of the mountain called Schütteberg. Today the townscape is characterised by the location of the whole historic city on top of a hill, making it visible from any direction.

Horb was first documented as a town in 1228, and the first references to a mayor (Schultheiß) and a market are to be found in 1244 and 1277, respectively. Until 1305, Horb belonged to the counts palatine of Tübingen, and later to the counts of Hohenberg. In 1381, Horb came into the possession of Austria (Further Austria) and served as an administrative seat for the local Vogt. Later, in 1806, Horb became part of the Kingdom of Württemberg, and a year it was made into an administrative center, Oberamt Horb. Its borders had changed several times in the following years, and in 1938 it was reorganized as a rural district, Landkreis Horb.

Current constituent communities Betra, Dettensee, Dettingen, Dettlingen and Dießen had belonged to the Principality of Hohenzollern-Sigmaringen since 1803, where they were organized under Oberamt Hechingen (and from 1838–1854, Oberamt Haigerloch). In 1925, Oberamt Hechingen was made into Landkreis Hechingen.

Between 1971 and 1975, a total of 18 surrounding municipalities, including the above-mentioned communities from the District of Hechingen, were assigned to Landkreis Horb or its legal successor, Landkreis Freudenstadt. The districts of both Horb and Hechingen were dissolved as part of Baden-Württemberg's 1973 local government reforms, and the majority of Horb's territory, including the city itself, was transferred to Freudenstadt, itself now part of the newly created Northern Black Forest Region in the recently expanded Regierungsbezirk of Karlsruhe. This is how a town that once belonged to Württemberg came to be administered from the former capital of Baden.

In 1979, Horb exceeded 20,000 residents for the first time, thus allowing the town to petition the state government of Baden-Württemberg to be made into a major district town (Große Kreisstadt); the request was granted, effective as of 1 January 1981.

Religion

In the Middle Ages, Horb am Neckar was part of the Diocese of Constance, under the local supervision of the Archdiaconate "Vor dem Walde", based in Dornstetten. When the Protestant Reformation came to Germany, Horb was still a part of Further Austria, and thus remained overwhelmingly Catholic along with the rest of Austria. Upon its transfer to the Kingdom of Württemberg, the territory was assigned to the Diocese of Rottenburg (today, Rottenburg-Stuttgart) and made the seat of a deanery. In 1976 it was merged with the Deanery of Freudenstadt to form a new deanery, still named for Freudenstadt but based in Horb; it contains nearly all of the Catholic parishes in the mostly Protestant Landkreis Freudenstadt.

Today there are two pastoral units (German Seelsorgeeinheiten) operating in the territory of Horb am Neckar: Seelsorgeeinheit Steinachtal includes the parishes in Altheim, Grünmettstetten, Bittelbronn, Untertalheim and Obertalheim; Seelsorgeeinheit Horb includes parishes in Horb itself, Ihlingen and Isenburg, Bildechingen, Mühlen, Rexingen and Nordstetten, Ahldorf and Mühringen, along with Wiesenstetten, which belongs to the municipality of Empfingen. Parishes in Betra, Dettensee, Dettingen, Dettlingen and Dießen have actually belonged to the Archdiocese of Freiburg (Deanery of Zollern) since 1827, due to those communities' former inclusion in the Principality of Hohenzollern-Sigmaringen.

In the 19th century, Protestants (Lutheran) also settled in Horb. In 1866, they were able to establish their first congregation there, and some time later build their own place of worship, the Johanneskirche (St. John's). The community based in Horb is part of the Sulz am Neckar district within the Evangelical-Lutheran Church in Württemberg, and includes members of the Protestant churches in Horb itself, in Altheim, Isenburg, Grünmettstetten, Nordstetten and Bildechingen, as well as in the neighboring municipality of Eutingen im Gäu. Another Protestant community based in Dettingen includes Protestants in Betra, Dießen, Ihlingen, and Rexingen along with neighboring Fischingen and Glatt; yet another one based in Mühlen includes those in Ahldorf, Dettensee, and Mühringen. Protestants in Talheim (formerly Obertalheim and Unterteilheim) belong to the Heiterback-Talheim community in the Nagold district, and those in Bittelbronn and Dettlingen belong to the Shopfloch community in the Freudenstadt district.

Aside from Germany's two major Christian denominations, there are also communities considered "free churches", including a Pentecostal congregation associated with Germany's Federation of Pentecostal Churches (Bund Freikirchlicher Pfingstgemeinden, BFD), the German branch of the Assemblies of God. There is also congregation of the New Apostolic Church in Horb, belonging to church's Tübingen apostolic region.

Horb and its constituent communities were once home to several Jewish communities, but during the Nazi era these communities suffered from forced mass emigration and deportation. Jewish communities could be found in Rexingen, Nordstetten and neighboring Baisingen, among others. Until 1911, Horb's Jewish communities were part of the Mühringen rabbinical district.

Coat of arms
The coat of arms of Horb am Neckar consists of a shield divided horizontally, the top half silver and the bottom half red. In the 13th century, the counts palatine of Tübingen established Horb as a town, incorporating the existing settlement along the Neckar. The oldest surviving town seal dates from 1261 and depicts the arms and banner of the counts palatine; an additional town seal from 1301 also depicts the arms of the Tübingen family.

In 1305 Horb was acquired via marriage by the counts of Hohenberg, and ever since the town has borne the Hohenberg arms. The oldest town seal bearing these arms comes from 1308.

Economy and infrastructure
Tourism plays a major role in the economy of Horb am Neckar, with numerous local projects and organizations in place to promote the town's various cultural events and attractions, which typically include concerts, Kabaretts, and theatrical performances. The annual Renaissance fair "Maximilian-Ritterspiele" ("Maximilian jousting"), taking place in the middle of June draws crowds from all over the region, and Horb's "Mini Rock Festival" hosts several thousand attendees each year and features musical acts from all over the world. Since 2005, the festival has been primarily organised and staffed by teenage volunteers.

The largest employer in town is the engineering firm Bosch Rexroth, which operates a plant in Horb. Other businesses with a presence in the town include the manufacturers Fischer and LEUCO. Most of Horb's industrial facilities are located in the constituent communities of Heiligenfeld or Hohenberg.

Local daily newspapers include the "Neckar-Chronik" edition of Südwest Presse, based in Ulm, and a Horb edition of the Schwarzwälder Bote, based in Oberndorf am Neckar.

Government
The local governing body is a town council (Gemeinderat) consisting of 32 members, with elections held every five years. Since the most recent elections in 2014, CDU holds 12 seats on the council, FDP holds 9, and SDP 5, with the remaining seats split Greens, Republicans, and independents.

The mayor (since 1981, Oberbürgermeister) is directly elected every eight years. The current officeholder, Peter Rosenberger (CDU) was elected in 2009 with 98.45% of the vote (no opponent).

List of mayors:
 1947–1949: Franz Mauz
 1950–1955: Karl Gramlich
 1955–1987: Karl Haegele (CDU)
 1987–1995: Hans Hörner (CDU)
 1995–2009: Michael Theurer (FDP)
 seit 2009: Peter Rosenberger (CDU)

Horb is also seat of the local court (Amtsgericht), which is positioned under the Rottweil regional court (Landgericht), itself under the umbrella of Oberlandesgericht Stuttgart, one of two supraregional courts in Baden-Württemberg (See Judiciary of Germany). The town also has a notary's office, as well as a satellite office of the Freudenstadt regional court.

The customs office (Zollamt) in Horb is subordinate office to the main customs office in Karlsruhe.

Main sights

 The annual Renaissance fair "Maximilian-Ritterspiele" (Maximilian-Jousting) in Horb which takes place in the middle of June
 The annual Rock festival "Mini-Rock-Festival" taking place in late August since 2005 organised voluntarily by adolescents

Notable people

 Georgius Eberhard (c. 1490), abbot at the monastery St. Blasien
 Veit Stoss (1447–1533), sculptor, painter and engraver
 Sebastian Lotzer (c. 1490 – died unknown), author of the Memmingen items and 12 items in the Peasant War
 Christina Rauscher (1570–1618), official and critic of witchcraft persecutions
 Martin Gerbert (1720–1793), Prince Abbot of St. Blasien
 Kaspar Kaltenmoser (1806–1867), genre painter
 Berthold Auerbach (1812–1882), writer
 Johann Nepomuk Meintel (1816–1872), sculptor and painter
 Johann Nepomuk Brischar (1819–1897), Catholic church historian
 Wilhelm Erath (1820–1908), merchant, Member of Parliament, mayor of the city 1874–1899
 Paul Leopold Haffner (1829–1899), Bishop of Mainz
 Paul Schanz (1842–1905), Catholic theology professor at the University of Tübingen
 Maximilian Berlitz (1852–1921), founder of the Berlitz language schools
 Lorenz Bock (1883–1948), President of Württemberg-Hohenzollern
 Georg Mayer (1892–1973) economist, Rector of the University of Leipzig
 Eberhard Gönner (1919–2012), historian, president of the Provincial Archives Directorate Baden-Württemberg
 Franz Blank (1925–2008), longtime council chairman and deputy chairman of the Supervisory Board of the Porsche AG
 Norbert Schneider (born 1935), lawyer and politician of the CDU
 Johannes Kreidler (born 1946), since 1991 auxiliary bishop in the diocese of Rottenburg-Stuttgart
 Carmina Brenner (born 1957), 1996–2007 Member of Parliament (CDU), since 2007 President of the State Statistical Office Baden-Württemberg
 Pascal Reinhardt (born 1992), football player

People connected to the town
 Berthold Auerbach Novelist and poet 
 Michael Jung, German equestrian and double Olympic gold medal winner 2012

International relations

Horb am Neckar is twinned with:
 Haslemere, Surrey, United Kingdom, since 1991
 Salins-les-Bains, France, since 1991
 Sant Just Desvern, Catalonia, Spain since 1999

See also
 Three hares

References

External links
 Horb am Neckar: pictures

Towns in Baden-Württemberg
Freudenstadt (district)
Populated places on the Neckar basin
Populated riverside places in Germany